Lighthouse Island may refer to:

 Lighthouse Island (Northern Ireland), in the Copeland Islands
 Vuurtoreneiland ("Lighthouse Island"), Netherlands
 Lighthouse Island (Lake Superior)